Laurenz Simoens (born 21 April 1998) is a Belgian footballer who currently plays for Gullegem as a forward.

References

External links

1998 births
Living people
Belgian footballers
Association football forwards
Cercle Brugge K.S.V. players
Challenger Pro League players